Colin Shaw (born March 17, 1954 in Powell River, British Columbia) is a retired Canadian sprint canoer who competed from the mid-1980s to the early 1990s. He won bronze medal with partner Don Brien in the K-2 1000 m event at the 1985 ICF Canoe Sprint World Championships in Mechelen.

Shaw also competed in two Summer Olympics, earning his best finish of ninth in the K-4 1000 m event at Los Angeles in 1984.

References

Sports-reference.com profile

1954 births
Canadian male canoeists
Canoeists at the 1984 Summer Olympics
Canoeists at the 1988 Summer Olympics
Living people
People from Powell River, British Columbia
Olympic canoeists of Canada
ICF Canoe Sprint World Championships medalists in kayak